Dorothy Masuka (3 September 1935, in Bulawayo, Southern Rhodesia (now Zimbabwe) – 23 February 2019, in Johannesburg, South Africa) was a Zimbabwe-born South African jazz singer.

Music career
Masuka's music was popular in South Africa throughout the 1950s, but when her songs became more serious, the government began questioning her. Her song "Dr. Malan," mentioning difficult laws, was banned and in 1961 she sang a song for Patrice Lumumba, which led to her exile. This exile lasted 31 years in total during which she lived in Zambia and worked as a flight attendant. She returned to Zimbabwe in 1980 after independence.

In August 2011, Dorothy Masuka and Mfundi Vundla, creator of the popular South African soap opera Generations, confirmed plans to make a film of Masuka's life. The film would concentrate on the years 1952 to 1957.

On 27 April 2017 she featured in the concert "The Jazz Epistles featuring Abdullah Ibrahim & Ekaya," at The Town Hall, New York City, opening the show and delivering "one passionate performance after another, warming up and winning over the crowd".

Dorothy Masuka died in Johannesburg on 23 February 2019, aged 83.

References

External links
"Dorothy Masuka", Afropop.
"Dorothy Masuka: The Definitive Collection Review", BBC Music.
Dorothy Masuka auf culturebase.net

1935 births
2019 deaths
20th-century Zimbabwean women singers
People from Bulawayo
Zimbabwean expatriates in Zambia
21st-century Zimbabwean women singers